Haus der Lüge (English: House of the Lie) is the fifth full-length studio release by the German band Einstürzende Neubauten, released in 1989 by Rough Trade Records. It was reissued in 2002 by Some Bizzare Records in the U.K., the band's own label Potomak in Europe and Thirsty Ear Recordings in the U.S.

Reception 

Trouser Press described the album as "a much stronger album than Fuenf."

Track listing
 "Prolog" - 1:50
 "Feurio!" - 6:02
 "Ein Stuhl in der Hölle" ("A Chair in Hell") - 2:09
 "Haus der Lüge" ("House of Lies") - 4:00
 "Epilog" - 0:28
 "Fiat Lux" - 12:24
 a) "Fiat Lux" ("Let there Be Light")
 b) "Maifestspiele" ("May Festival")
 c) "Hirnlego" ("Brainlego")
 "Schwindel" ("Deception") - 3:58
 "Der Kuss" ("The Kiss") - 3:37
 "Feurio! (Remix)" - 4:47
 "Partymucke" ("Party Music") - 3:52
 "Feurio! (Türen Offen)" ("Feurio! (Doors Open)") - 4:47

Tracks 9, 10, and 11 are taken from the "Feurio!" single and are only present on the 1995 and 2002 re-releases of the album. The 2002 re-release was remastered by the band. On some releases, Epilog is part of Track 4.

Personnel
Einstürzende Neubauten
 Blixa Bargeld - guitar, lead vocals
 Mark Chung - bass, backing vocals
 Alexander Hacke - guitar, backing vocals
 N.U. Unruh - percussion, backing vocals
 F.M. Einheit - percussion, backing vocals

"Partymucke" was originally written for Peter Zadek's Andi play, which Einstürzende Neubauten performed live 50 times in 1987.

The Maifestspiele section of "Fiat Lux" contains field recordings from a demonstration in Kreuzberg, Berlin on 1 May 1987.

"Ein Stuhl in der Hölle" and the "Hirnlego" section of "Fiat Lux" were later included as part of the Strategies Against Architecture II collection.

Notes 
The cover art is based on a woodcut titled "Group of Six Horses" by German Renaissance artist Hans Baldung Grien.

References

Einstürzende Neubauten albums
1989 albums
Thirsty Ear Recordings albums
Some Bizzare Records albums